The Guest Room is a 2021 Italian thriller-drama film directed by Stefano Lodovichi. Produced by Lucky Red, the film was distributed on the Prime Video platform starting January 4, 2021. Outside Italy it was distributed by the same platform under the title The Guest Room.

Production 
During the lockdown imposed by the Italian government due to the COVID-19 pandemic, director Stefano Lodovichi has developed the intention to shoot a film on the phenomenon of hikikomori, boys who voluntarily choose to shut themselves up in their room without leaving it for any reason. The film should have been a documentary however, going on with the writing of the work, the director preferred to create a fictional story that dealt with the subject in such a way as to identify the reasons for this social phenomenon in the stimuli received within a family today. The choice to set the film entirely inside a house is functional in addressing these issues. Filming took place during the lockdown, for two weeks.

Cast
Guido Caprino as the guest
Camilla Filippi as Stella
Edoardo Pesce as Sandro
Romeo Pellegrini as Giulio

References

External links

2021 films
2020s Italian-language films
2021 thriller drama films
Italian thriller drama films
Films about dysfunctional families
Films about time travel
2020s Italian films